A dramatic soprano is a type of operatic soprano with a powerful, rich, emotive voice that can sing over, or cut through, a full orchestra. Thicker vocal folds in dramatic voices usually (but not always) mean less agility than lighter voices but a sustained, fuller sound. Usually this voice has a lower tessitura than other sopranos, and a darker timbre. They are often used for heroic, often long-suffering, tragic women of opera. Dramatic sopranos have a range from approximately low A (A3) to "high C" (C6). Some dramatic sopranos, known as Wagnerian sopranos, have an exceptionally big voice that can assert itself over a large orchestra (of more than 80 or even 100 pieces). These voices are substantial, often denser in tone, extremely powerful and, ideally, evenly balanced throughout the vocal registers. Wagnerian sopranos usually play mythic heroines. Successful Wagnerian sopranos are rare and often Wagnerian roles are performed by Italianate dramatic sopranos.

Dramatic roles
The following dramatic roles are for dramatic sopranos:

Wagnerian soprano roles
The following Wagnerian soprano roles are for dramatic sopranos:

 Brünnhilde, Die Walküre, Siegfried, Götterdämmerung (Wagner)
 Elektra, Elektra (Richard Strauss)
 Isolde, Tristan und Isolde (Wagner)
 The Wife, Die Frau ohne Schatten (Richard Strauss)
 Senta, Der fliegende Holländer (Wagner)
 Kundry, Parsifal (Wagner)
 Ortrud, Lohengrin (Wagner)

See also

Coloratura soprano
Lyric soprano
Soubrette
Spinto soprano

References
Notes

Sources

Voice types
Opera terminology
 Dramatic Sopranos

fr:Soprano#Soprano dramatique